This is a list of North American national soccer team managers. This encompasses every soccer manager who currently manages a national team under the control of Confederation of North, Central American and Caribbean Association Football (CONCACAF) or a national regional body.

Managers
Last update: 10 February 2023. Default sorting is descending by time as manager.

See also
List of African national football team managers
List of European national football team managers
List of Asian national football team managers
List of South American national football team managers
List of Oceanian national football team managers

References